Elijah Winnington (born 5 May 2000) is an Australian competitive swimmer who specialises in the sprint freestyle events. He has competed in the 2018 Commonwealth Games, Pan Pacific Swimming Championships, FINA World Junior Swimming Championships, 2020 Summer Olympics, and 2022 World Aquatics Championships. Winnington is the current 400m freestyle world champion.

Background
Winnington was born in Gold Coast, Queensland. He went to King's Christian College, graduating in 2017. Winnington eventually swam under Richard Spence at Bond Swimming Club for a couple of years until changing to St Peter's Western under Dean Boxall.

Career
Winnington won three bronze medals at the 2017 FINA World Junior Swimming Championships in the 200 m freestyle and the  freestyle and  medley relays. Winnington's breakthrough would come at the 2018 Commonwealth Games where he won gold in the  freestyle relay alongside Kyle Chalmers, Alexander Graham and Mack Horton. The relay team's time of 7:05.97 was a games record.

In 2019, Winnington would compete at the 2019 Australian Swimming Championships, winning gold in the 400 m freestyle event and silver in the 200 m freestyle event. Two years later at the 2021 Australian Swimming Championships, Winnington would retain his title in the 400 m freestyle event and won bronze in the 200 m freestyle event.

2020 Summer Olympics
At the 2021 Australian Swimming Trials, Winnington competed in the 50 m, 100 m, 200 m, 400 m and 800 m freestyle events. He qualified for the Olympic team in the 200 m and 400 m events, coming first in the 400 m event and second in the 200 m. Although Winnington qualified with the fastest time in the world for the 400m freestyle, he failed to claim a medal in the final.

2022 World Aquatics Championships
Winnington won his first international gold medal in the 400m freestyle during the 2022 World Aquatics Championships in Budapest, Hungary. He swam a personal best time of 3:41.22 in the final, which was the 5th fastest time in the history of the men's 400m freestyle (long course). Winnington also won bronze in the 4x200m freestyle relay.

References

External links

2000 births
Living people
Australian male freestyle swimmers
Sportspeople from the Gold Coast, Queensland
Swimmers at the 2018 Commonwealth Games
Swimmers at the 2022 Commonwealth Games
Commonwealth Games medallists in swimming
Commonwealth Games gold medallists for Australia
Commonwealth Games bronze medallists for Australia
Swimmers at the 2020 Summer Olympics
Medalists at the 2020 Summer Olympics
Olympic swimmers of Australia
Olympic bronze medalists for Australia
Olympic bronze medalists in swimming
World Aquatics Championships medalists in swimming
21st-century Australian people
Commonwealth Games competitors for Australia
Sportsmen from Queensland
Medallists at the 2018 Commonwealth Games
Medallists at the 2022 Commonwealth Games